Fam (Fám; exonym: Kɔŋa) is a Bantoid language of Bali LGA in Taraba State, Nigeria. It is now usually left as unclassified within Bantoid, however Blench (2011) classifies it as a divergent Mambiloid language potentially related to Ndoola.

References

Mambiloid languages
Languages of Nigeria